Cubophis brooksi, the  Swan Island racer, is a species of snake in the family Colubridae. The species is native to Little Swan Island in Honduras.

References

Cubophis
Snakes of North America
Reptiles described in 1914
Endemic fauna of Honduras]
Reptiles of Honduras]
Taxa named by Thomas Barbour